The 26th Reserve Division (26. Reserve-Division) was a unit of the Imperial German Army in World War I. The division was formed on the mobilization of the German Army in August 1914 as part of the XIV Reserve Corps. The division was disbanded in 1919 during the demobilization of the German Army after World War I. The division was raised in the Kingdom of Württemberg.

Combat chronicle

The 26th Reserve Division spent World War I on the Western Front. It fought in the Battle of the Frontiers and then participated in the Race to the Sea, fighting in the Somme region. It occupied the line in the Somme/Artois region into 1916, facing the British offensive in the Battle of the Somme. It was relieved from the Somme in October 1916 and spent the winter of 1916-1917 in the Artois. In 1917, it fought in the Battle of Arras. In 1918, it fought in the German spring offensive and against the subsequent Allied offensives and counteroffensives. Allied intelligence rated the division as first class.

Order of battle on mobilization

The order of battle of the 26th Reserve Division on mobilization was as follows:

51. Reserve-Infanterie-Brigade
10. Württembergisches Infanterie-Regiment Nr. 180
Württembergisches Reserve-Infanterie-Regiment Nr. 121
52. Reserve-Infanterie-Brigade
Württembergisches Reserve-Infanterie-Regiment Nr. 119
Württembergisches Reserve-Infanterie-Regiment Nr. 120
Württembergisches Reserve-Dragoner-Regiment
Württembergisches Reserve-Feldartillerie-Regiment Nr. 26
4. Kompanie/Württembergisches Pionier-Bataillon Nr. 13

Order of battle on March 20, 1918

The 26th Reserve Division was triangularized in January 1917. Over the course of the war, other changes took place, including the formation of artillery and signals commands and a pioneer battalion. The order of battle on March 20, 1918, was as follows:

51. Reserve-Infanterie-Brigade
Württembergisches Reserve-Infanterie-Regiment Nr. 119
Württembergisches Reserve-Infanterie-Regiment Nr. 121
10. Württembergisches Infanterie-Regiment Nr. 180
Maschinengewehr-Scharfschützen-Abteilung Nr. 54
2. Eskadron/Ulanen-Regiment König Wilhelm I (2. Württembergisches) Nr. 20
Artillerie-Kommandeur 122
Württembergisches Reserve-Feldartillerie-Regiment Nr. 26
Fußartillerie-Bataillon Nr. 59
Pionier-Bataillon Nr. 326
4. Kompanie/Württembergisches Pionier-Bataillon Nr. 13
6. Kompanie/Württembergisches Pionier-Bataillon Nr. 13
Minenwerfer-Kompanie Nr. 226
Divisions-Nachrichten-Kommandeur 426

References
 26. Reserve-Division (Chronik 1914/1918) - Der erste Weltkrieg
 Hermann Cron et al., Ruhmeshalle unserer alten Armee (Berlin, 1935)
 Hermann Cron, Geschichte des deutschen Heeres im Weltkriege 1914-1918 (Berlin, 1937)
 Günter Wegner, Stellenbesetzung der deutschen Heere 1815-1939. (Biblio Verlag, Osnabrück, 1993), Bd. 1
 Histories of Two Hundred and Fifty-One Divisions of the German Army which Participated in the War (1914-1918), compiled from records of Intelligence section of the General Staff, American Expeditionary Forces, at General Headquarters, Chaumont, France 1919 (1920)

Notes

Infantry divisions of Germany in World War I
Military units and formations established in 1914
Military units and formations disestablished in 1919
1914 establishments in Germany